D45 connects the A3 motorway Kutina interchange to Kutina, Garešnica and the D5 state road. The road forms two junctions to the D26 state road, one in Garešnica, where D26 branches off to Daruvar, and another  further north, where the D26 branches off to Čazma and Vrbovec. Between those two junctions the D45 and D26 are concurrent. The northern terminus of the road is in Veliki Zdenci, at a junction to the D5 state road to Virovitica (to the north) and Daruvar and Pakrac (to the south).

The road, as well as all other state roads in Croatia, is managed and maintained by Hrvatske ceste, a state-owned company.

Traffic volume 

Traffic is regularly counted and reported by Hrvatske ceste, operator of the road.

Road junctions and populated areas

Maps

Sources

D045
D045
D045